Lao Pie-fang, known as a Hun-hutze (red beard), was a guerrilla leader fighting in western Liaoning against Japanese occupation. He led several thousand followers to attack Japanese garrisons in the southern portion of the South Manchurian Railroad mainline in early 1932, during the pacification of Manchukuo.

The Japanese garrison of Newchwangchen was encircled and attacked while other troops under his orders attacked in the Haicheng area. Japanese reinforcements quickly dispatched from Mukden forced Lao's retirement, but Lao Pie-fang emerged as an Anti-Japanese Volunteer Army general and was acclaimed as commander by the local bands of the brotherhoods and citizen militias.

See also
Japanese invasion of Manchuria

Sources 
Coogan, Anthony, The volunteer armies of Northeast China, History Today; July 1993, Vol. 43 Issue 7, pp.36-41
Notes On A Guerrilla Campaign, from http://www.democraticunderground.com accessed November 4, 2006

Year of birth missing
Year of death missing
Republic of China Army generals
Chinese people of World War II